The Bois-du-Luc was a coal mine in Houdeng-Aimeries, near La Louvière, in Belgium which today is preserved as an industrial heritage site. As well as the site of the headquarters of the Société des Charbonnages de Bois-du-Luc et d'Havre, the Bois du Luc was the site of the Saint Emmanuel Pit (Fosse Saint-Emmanuel) which belonged to the company. The Fosse Saint-Emmanuel was one of the oldest mines in Belgium, with recorded activity dating back to 1685. The company ceased mining in 1973.

The Bois-du-Luc is particularly known for the surrounding company town (cité ouvrière) which was created for the mine works during the 19th century and is today one of the most notable surviving remnants of industrial paternalism in Belgium.

The site, run as an ecomuseum since 1983, features on the European Route of Industrial Heritage and is one of the four Walloon mining sites listed by UNESCO as a World Heritage Site under the Major Mining Sites of Wallonia listing.

Further reading
 Charles-Albert de Behault, Les Charbonnages de Bois-du-Luc, une histoire de familles, Bulletin de l'Association de la Noblesse du Royaume de Belgique, avril 2022, n° 310, pp. 78-103.
 Joseph Plumet, Une société minière sous l’Ancien Régime, la « Société du Grand Conduit et du Charbonnage d’Houdeng » 1685 –1800, Imprim. J. Duculot, Gembloux, 1941; 145 pages.
 Victor Delattre et Joseph Plumet, Les Charbonnages du Bois-du-Luc et d’Havré, notices historiques, 1935, 181 pages. 
 Ouvrage collectif, Bois-du-Luc 1685-1985, Écomusée régional du Centre, 1985, 182 pages.
 Jules Monoyer, Mémoire sur l’origine et le développement de l’industrie houillère dans le Bassin du Centre, Mons, 1874.
 Bois-du-Luc, un écrin majestueux où la vie des mineurs se raconte, Guide - Ecomusée régional du Centre, 2004, 98 p.
 Jacques Liébin et Evelyne Masure-Hannecart, Bois-du-Luc : un site charbonnier du XIXe siècle, éd. Pierre Mardaga, coll. "Musées vivants de Wallonie et de Bruxelles", 1987.

Images

External links

Official website 
Bois-du-Luc Ecomuseum at 365.be

European Route of Industrial Heritage Anchor Points
Mining museums
Industry museums in Belgium
Museums in Hainaut (province)
La Louvière
Coal mines in Belgium